Gulf of İzmit (Turkish: İzmit Körfezi),  also referred to as Izmit Bay, is a bay at the easternmost edge of the Sea of Marmara, in Kocaeli Province, Turkey. The gulf takes its name from the city of İzmit. Other cities and towns around the bay are Gebze, Körfez, Gölcük, and Altınova. 

The İzmit Bay Bridge is a suspension bridge that bridges the gulf.

The North Anatolian Fault Zone, the most prominent active fault in Turkey and the source of numerous large earthquakes throughout history, passes through the Gulf of İzmit.

Etymology 
Iznik’s ancient names were Gulf of Astacus, Sinus Astacenus, Olbianus Sinus and Gulf of Nicomedia.

It took the names Gulf of Astacus and Sinus Astacenus from the city Astacus.

See also
 Astacus in Bithynia
 Astacus – a genus of crayfish (from the Greek word αστακός (astakós), adopted into Turkish as ıstakoz, both meaning lobster)
 Nicomedia (modern İzmit) – the eastern and most senior capital of the Roman Empire during the Tetrarchy system
 İzmit
 İzmit Bay Bridge
 İzmit Körfez Circuit

References

External links
 Motorway over the Gulf

Izmit
Sea of Marmara